Eadwulf (sometimes Eadulf) is an Anglo-Saxon male name. Notable people with the name include:

 Eadwulf of Elmham, a 10th-century Bishop of Elmham
 Eadwulf of Hereford (died 830s), Bishop of Hereford
 Eadwulf I of Northumbria, king of Northumbria in 704 and 705
 Eadwulf II of Northumbria (died 913), ruler of northern Northumbria
 Eadwulf Cudel of Bernicia (Eadulf II) (died 1020s)
 Eadulf III of Bernicia (died 1041)
 Eadwulf of Crediton (died 934), Bishop of Crediton
 Eadwulf of Lindsey (died circa 937), Bishop of Lindsey
 Eadwulf Evil-child (fl. 970s), Northumbrian ruler

See also
 Ealdwulf
 Eardwulf

Germanic masculine given names
Old English given names